Lea Zahoui Blavo (born 19 April 1975) is an Ivorian judoka. She competed in the women's middleweight event at the 2000 Summer Olympics.

References

1975 births
Living people
Ivorian female judoka
Olympic judoka of Ivory Coast
Judoka at the 2000 Summer Olympics
Place of birth missing (living people)